Razvar (also known as Razdar and Zarūr) is a village in Heshmatabad Rural District, in the Central District of Dorud County, Lorestan Province, Iran. At the 2006 census, its population was recorded at 368, in 85 families.

References 

Towns and villages in Dorud County